The 2010 edition of the UNAF U-17 Tournament took place in July 2010. Tunisia hosted the tournament.

Participants

 (invited)
 (invited)
 (invited)

Group stage
All times are local UTC+1.

Group A

Group B

Knockout stage

Fifth-place match

Third-place match

Final

Champions

External links
Mali wins unaf u-17 competition - cafonline.com

2010 in African football
2010
2009
2010–11 in Algerian football
2010–11 in Tunisian football
2010–11 in Moroccan football
2010–11 in Bahraini football